Louis C. Watson (August 31, 1924 – May 24, 2012) was an American basketball player and coach for Indiana University. The 6'-5" Watson played for Jeffersonville High School in Jeffersonville, Indiana, graduating in 1943.  He was a four year letterman, starting every game of his career. He competed for the Hoosiers from 1947 to 1950, and was their leading scorer and a first-team All-Big Ten honoree in 1950.  After serving as freshman and assistant varsity basketball coach at Indiana, Watson was Indiana's head coach from 1965-1971. He led the Hoosiers to a Big Ten co-championship in 1967, finishing with a 62–60 record. In 1971, he stepped down from head coaching to become a special assistant to the athletic director. He retired from that position in 1987. On May 25, 2012, Watson died at the age of 88 in Fairfax, Virginia.

References

1924 births
2012 deaths
Chicago Stags draft picks
Indiana Hoosiers men's basketball coaches
Indiana Hoosiers men's basketball players
American men's basketball players